Bodindecha (Sing Singhaseni) School (โรงเรียนบดินทรเดชา (สิงห์ สิงหเสนี)), commonly abbreviated as Bodin, is a Thai high school. It teaches students from grades 7–12. The school is in Wang Thong Lang, Bangkok. The number of currently registered students is approximately 5,000.

The school was established on 30 April 1971. The school is named in honour of Chao Phraya Bodindecha, also known as Sing Singhaseni, who was a general from Yasothon under King Rama III (Phra Nangklao) of Siam.

References

External links 
 Official school website
 BoDinZone.com (Community Website)
 Bodin Band
 25th Bodin Alumni 

Educational institutions established in 1971
Schools in Bangkok
1971 establishments in Thailand